The 1912 Missouri Tigers football team was an American football team that represented the University of Missouri in the Missouri Valley Conference (MVC) during the 1912 college football season. The team compiled a 5–3 record (2–3 against MVC opponents), finished in fourth place in the conference, and outscored all opponents by a combined total of 135 to 69. Chester Brewer was the head coach for the second of three seasons. The team played its home games at Rollins Field in Columbia, Missouri.

Schedule

References

Missouri
Missouri Tigers football seasons
Missouri Tigers football